Ladakh Lok Sabha seat is the only Lok Sabha (parliamentary) constituency of the union territory of Ladakh, India.

Members of Parliament

Election results

17th Lok Sabha: 2019 General Elections

16th Lok Sabha: 2014 General Elections

14th Lok Sabha: 2004 General Elections

See also
 Leh district
 Kargil district
 Srinagar Lok Sabha constituency, and other seats in J&K 
 Barmer Lok Sabha constituency and Kachchh, second and third largest by area
 Malkajgiri Lok Sabha constituency, largest by population
 Lakshadweep Lok Sabha constituency, smallest by population
 List of Constituencies of the Lok Sabha

References

Government of Ladakh
Constituencies of the Lok Sabha
1967 establishments in Jammu and Kashmir